Stewart Cameron may refer to

 Stewart Cameron (cartoonist) (1912–1970), Canadian editorial and cowboy cartoonist
 Stewart Cameron (cricketer) (1920–2001), New Zealand cricketer
 Stewart Cameron (nephrologist) (born 1934), British nephrologist

See also
Stuart Cameron (disambiguation)